Sabinov is a small town located in the Prešov Region (north-eastern Slovakia), approximately 20 km from Prešov and 55 km from Košice. The population of Sabinov is 12,700.

Etymology
The name apparently comes from some shortened Slavic personal name, e.g.  Soba, Sobin, Sobina (probably a short form of Soběslav). In Poland, there are documented personal names Soba, Zoba, Sobien (Soben or Sobin), Sobon (Soboń) and medieval village names Szebne, Szobniow. In the Czech Republic, Sobyn, Sobień, Soběn and medieval village names Sobyenow, Sobíňov, Soběnov. The  theory about the origin in a personal name  is supported also by the common Slavic possessive suffix -ov preserved  in later documents. The names Zob, Zoba, Zobas were used also in the Kingdom of Hungary in the 12th-13th century, but they may not be related to Soběslav and could be also of Hungarian origin.

As legend has it, the name derives from the daughter of the landlord of Tharkveley called Szabina who would have been the wife of Andrew II of Hungary, and the king built the city in remembrance of her.

1299 Scibinio, 1471 Sabinov, 1518 Kiss Zeben.

History 

The first written record about Sabinov is from the year 1248 (Sceben). Sabinov was initially a Slovak village until German settlers (more specifically Zipsers) came in the middle of the 13th century. In 1299 Sabinov received municipal privileges, and in 1405 it was declared a free royal town by king Sigismund, Holy Roman Emperor. In the 15th century Sabinov joined the Pentapolitana, an alliance of five towns of northeastern Kingdom of Hungary (Bardejov/Bártfa, Levoča/Lőcse, Košice/Kassa, Prešov/Eperjes and Sabinov/Kisszeben). The 16th and 17th century was the era of Sabinov's development and economic growth followed by the years of recession. In 1740, an important secondary school was established by the Piarists. The history of Sabinov is very similar to the history of other towns in this region.

Demographics 

According to the 1880 census, the town had 2,825 inhabitants, 2,088 Slovaks (73.9%), 245 Hungarians (8.7%), 412 Germans (14.6%) and others.

According to the 1910 census, the town had 3,288 inhabitants, 1,640 Slovaks (49.9%), 1,168 Hungarians (35.5%), 341 Germans (10.4%), 120 Romanians (3.6%), and others.

According to the 2001 census, the town had 12,290 inhabitants. 90.62% of inhabitants were Slovaks, 6.40% Roma, 0.48% Czechs, and 0.14% Rusyns. Most of the Hungarians and Carpathian-Germans were expelled after World War II and their houses confiscated in the "Slovakization" of Sabinov. The religious makeup was 70.48% Roman Catholics, 10.53% Greek Catholics, 5.14% people with no religious affiliation and 4.16% Lutherans.

The Shop on Main Street
The acclaimed Czechoslovak film, The Shop on Main Street, which was shot in Sabinov during 1964, was awarded the Academy Award for Best Foreign Language Film (of 1965) in Santa Monica, California in 1966. In 1967 the film's lead actress, Ida Kaminska, was nominated for the Best Actress in a Leading Role for her screen work in this motion picture. She and the lead actor, Jozef Kroner, were also honored at the Cannes Film Festival in France for their roles in the film.

Notable people

Károly Wagner (1732–1790), Hungarian historian, priest and teacher
Ede Bartsch (1796–1871), Hungarian physician
Bohuš Nosák-Nezabudov (1818–1877), poet, writer, journalist, member of Ľudovít Štúr's group
Tivadar Csontváry Kosztka (1853–1919), famous painter, born in Sabinov
Pavol Peter Gojdič (1888–1960), Greek Catholic bishop, since 1917 worked in Sabinov as an assistant parish priest; in 2001 was beatified by Pope John-Paul II.
Anton Prídavok (1904–1945), poet, writer, playwright, director
Leslie Lawrance Foldy(1919–2001) was a theoretical physicist,

Twin towns — sister cities

Sabinov is twinned with:
 Çubuk, Turkey
 Kenderes, Hungary
 Siedlce, Poland
 Soběslav, Czech Republic

External links
Official site

References

Cities and towns in Slovakia
Šariš
Romani communities in Slovakia